Schizocephala is a genus of praying mantises in the monotypic tribe Schizocephalini. It is represented by a single species, Schizocephala bicornis. It is distributed across Pakistan, India, Nepal, Sri Lanka and the Sunda Islands.

Gallery

References

Eremiaphilidae
Insects described in 1758
Taxa named by Carl Linnaeus
Monotypic insect genera